Arthur Somerset may refer to:

 Lord Arthur John Henry Somerset (1780–1816), politician
 Lord Henry Arthur George Somerset (1851–1926), British aristocrat
 Arthur Somerset senior (1855–1937), English cricketer
 Arthur Somerset junior (1889–1957), English cricketer, son of the above